Mouradian or Muratyan is a common Armenian surname. It may refer to:

David Mouradian (born 1951), Armenian philologist, writer, film critic and publicist
John Mouradian, Canadian lacrosse coach
Khatchig Mouradian, Armenian editor, lecturer, poet, and author
Mikaël Antoine Mouradian (born 1961),  Armenian Catholic bishop in the United States

See also
Karo Murat (born 1983), real name Karen Muratyan, German professional boxer of Armenian descent 
 

Armenian-language surnames